Birgit Platzer (born 14 October 1992 in Kirchdorf an der Krems) is an Austrian luger.

Platzer competed at the 2014 Winter Olympics for Austria. In the Women's singles she placed 23rd.

As of September 2014, Platzer's best performance at the FIL World Luge Championships is 16th, in the 2012 Championships.

As of September 2014, Platzer's best Luge World Cup overall finish is 19th in 2012–13.

References

External links 
 
 

1992 births
Living people
Austrian female lugers
Lugers at the 2014 Winter Olympics
Lugers at the 2018 Winter Olympics
Olympic lugers of Austria
People from Kirchdorf an der Krems
Sportspeople from Upper Austria
20th-century Austrian women
21st-century Austrian women